The 2020–21 Slovenian Second League season was the 30th edition of the Slovenian Second League. The season began on 11 August 2020 and ended on 22 May 2021.

Teams

First stage

Standings

Results

Second stage

Promotion group

Standings

Results

Relegation group

Standings

Results

Season statistics

Top goalscorers

Source: NZS

See also
2020–21 Slovenian Football Cup
2020–21 Slovenian PrvaLiga

References

External links
Official website 

Slovenian Second League seasons
2
Slovenia